Hileh Sara (also Romanized as Ḩīleh Sarā; also known as Heleh Sarāy and Heleh Sarā-ye Lemīr) is a village in Chubar Rural District, Haviq District, Talesh County, Gilan Province, Iran. At the 2006 census, its population was 333, in 75 families.

References 

Populated places in Talesh County